The Municipal Chamber of Rio de Janeiro is the unicameral legislative body of the city of Rio de Janeiro. It was founded in 1565 by the Portuguese colonists.

External links
 Website

Municipal chambers in Brazil
Politics of Rio de Janeiro (city)
Organisations based in Rio de Janeiro (city)